Ipeľské Predmostie is a village and municipality in the Veľký Krtíš District of the Banská Bystrica Region of southern Slovakia.

History
In historical records, the village was first mentioned in 1252 (Hydweg) when King Béla IV gave it to Count Myko. Before, it belonged to Hont. In castle. In 1438 it belonged to feudatory György Palóczy and, after to Esztergom Archbishopric. In 1570 it was pillaged by Turks. A map of 1825 shows Hidveg, in the district of Honth (now Hont) was in Hungary and then became part of the Austro/Hungarian Empire, ruled by Emperor Franz Joseph.  After World War I, borders were redrawn and Hidveg became part of Czechoslovakia. (Passports dated 1920 show Hidveg as part of Czechoslovakia.)  A treaty returned Hidveg to Hungary from 1938 to 1945.  After 1945 the borders were again changed and Hidveg once again was part of Czechoslovakia.  It is now renamed and in Slovakia.

Genealogical resources

The records for genealogical research are available at the state archive "Statny Archiv in Banska Bystrica, Slovakia", 1895-1905.

See also
 List of municipalities and towns in Slovakia

External links
 
 Statistical Office of the Slovak republic
 Obec Ipeľské Predmostie (Ipolyhidvég)
 Surnames of living people in Ipelske Predmostie

Villages and municipalities in Veľký Krtíš District
Hungarian communities in Slovakia